Marlanna Evans (born January 21, 1983), better known by her stage name Rapsody, is an American rapper. After signing with music producer 9th Wonder's music label It's a Wonderful World Music Group, she released a series of mixtapes and collaborated with Erykah Badu and Talib Kweli. Soon afterwards Rapsody released her debut album The Idea of Beautiful (2012). She would attain further prominence when she was featured on Kendrick Lamar's 2015 album To Pimp a Butterfly, on the track "Complexion (A Zulu Love)".

Her second album, Laila's Wisdom (2017), received critical acclaim and was nominated at the Grammy Awards for Best Rap Album and Best Rap Song. Rapsody released her third studio album, Eve on August 23, 2019 to critical acclaim from music critics. In 2020, she was featured alongside Cordae, Chika, and Busta Rhymes, on the Stevie Wonder song "Can't Put It in the Hands of Fate".

Career
Rapsody began her career at North Carolina State University, where she joined hip hop collective H2O and its spinoff group Kooley High, despite not having rapped before. The group met producer 9th Wonder in 2004, who was impressed by one of Rapsody's verses, and she would go on to make her recording debut on 9th Wonder's sophomore album, The Dream Merchant Vol. 2 which released on October 9, 2007, in which she free styled over 9th's re-chopping of old samples he already used for other artists.

She launched her solo career in 2008 after signing with 9th Wonder's It's A Wonderful World Music Group. Her first significant career breakthrough came with the release of her mixtape Return of the B-Girl on December 7, 2010. Return of the B-Girl marked her first work with hip-hop producer, DJ Premier, and featured guests such as Mac Miller and Big Daddy Kane. She continued to build acclaim with the release of her next mixtape, Thank H.E.R. Now which showcased her storytelling abilities as she drew from personal life experiences and featured her work with a variety of critically acclaimed acts such as Marsha Ambrosius, Estelle, Raekwon, Jean Grae, Murs, and Big K.R.I.T.

Her next project, For Everything was released on November 15, 2011 and showcased her work with both newly acclaimed and established acts such as Kendrick Lamar and Freeway and a number of the tracks were featured in XXL magazine's "Bangers" section. In May 2011, Rapsody joined Mac Miller on his Incredibly Dope Tour for 15 dates. In late 2011, she toured with Phonte and 9th Wonder as a part of the Phonte & 9th Wonder Tour.

Rapsody signed to Jay-Z's record label Roc Nation in July 2016, and her debut for the label, Laila's Wisdom, was released on September 22, 2017. The album received two Grammy Award nominations for Best Rap Album and Best Rap Song.

Rapsody's third studio album, Eve, was released on August 23, 2019 to critical acclaim from music critics.

Style and philosophy
Rapsody is known for her intricate rhyme patterns, metaphors, and wordplay. She cites Jay-Z, Mos Def, Lauryn Hill and MC Lyte as the biggest influences on her music. Her production is primarily handled by The Soul Council, the team of in-house producers at It's A Wonderful World Music Group comprising E. Jones, Ka$h Don't Make Beats, AMP, Eric G., Nottz and Khrysis. Rapsody's philosophy is "Culture Over Everything," referring to the culture of hip-hop music. She describes this phrase in an interview with Vibe Magazine where she says, "To me, it’s about culture more so than money or anything. I make music for the people of the culture we’re in; that comes first. If you touch the people first, the rest just falls into place. That’s what it means to me, just preserving and respecting the culture."

Personal life
In her younger years, she watched the MTV show Yo! MTV Raps and considered MC Lyte as one of her early influences and later stated Lauryn Hill as an all-time favorite. She grew up in the small town of Snow Hill in North Carolina. Rapsody wasn't exposed to much hip hop and would listen to what her older cousins would play in the car. She would later develop her love for hip hop when she entered college.

Her 2017 album Laila's Wisdom was named after her grandmother, Laila Ray.

In 2019, Rapsody played for the "Home" roster during the NBA All-Star Celebrity Game at the Bojangles' Coliseum in Charlotte, North Carolina. The roster was made up of celebrities with Carolina roots. Her team won the game and she had one assist in the game while playing around 12 minutes.

Discography

Studio albums
The Idea of Beautiful (2012)
Laila's Wisdom (2017)
Eve (2019)

Extended plays
 The Black Mamba (2012)
 Beauty and the Beast (2014)
 Crown (2016)

with Kooley High
 Kooley High Presents... Raleigh's Finest (Mixtape) (2007)
 The Summer Sessions EP (2008)
 Eastern Standard Time (2010)
 Kooley High Presents...David Thompson (2011)

Mixtapes
 Return of the B-Girl (2010)
 Thank H.E.R. Now (2011)
 For Everything (2011)
 She Got Game (2013)

Guest appearances

References 

https://www.datpiff.com/Kooley-High-Kooley-High-Presents-Raleighs-Finest-mixtape.37187.html

External links 
 
 Jamla Records Website
 Rocnation on Rapsody

1983 births
Living people
21st-century American rappers
21st-century American women musicians
American women rappers
African-American women rappers
Grammy Award winners
North Carolina State University alumni
People from Snow Hill, North Carolina
Rappers from North Carolina
Roc Nation artists
Songwriters from North Carolina
Southern hip hop musicians
African-American songwriters
21st-century women rappers